Ryan Moseley (born 8 October 1982 in Bridgetown) is a Barbados-born Austrian sprinter who specializes in the 100 metres and 200 metres. He is several times Austrian champion sprinter for 60m, 100m and 200m track & field events.

Achievements

External links 

1982 births
Living people
Austrian male sprinters
Naturalised citizens of Austria
Austrian people of Barbadian descent